Edward Arthur Toth is an American musician and drummer for The Doobie Brothers, an American rock band. Toth joined the Doobie Brothers in 2005 following his departure from Vertical Horizon.

Early life
Toth says that he has been drumming most of his life. He made good use of his father's record collection and was active in all music programs in East Lyme, Connecticut, playing in his high school band at East Lyme High School.

Education
He went on to attend the University of Miami's Frost School of Music, where he received a Bachelor of Music degree in 1994. While still at the University of Miami, Toth became a member of the funk and rock band Jennifer Culture.

Vertical Horizon
Toth has played in numerous other rock and funk bands over the last decade. Most notably, he was a member of Vertical Horizon from 1996 to 2005, which yielded a multi platinum album Everything You Want, the title track of which also charted #1. Toth's association with the group began when he was working at a Boston Borders Books; The mother of Vertical Horizon's lead singer and guitarist Matt Scannell, was shopping in the bookstore and asked Ed for a Vertical Horizon CD, which he had listened to and quite enjoyed. His enthusiasm for the recording impressed Scannell's mother so much that, in gratitude for the assistance she received at the store, she offered to put the bookstore manager and a friend on the guest list for a Vertical Horizon show at Mama Kin, an Aerosmith-owned nightclub in Boston. Toth went to the show as the manager's friend, and when the band had an opening for a drummer Toth auditioned for the spot.

Doobie Brothers
Toth is the fifth and current drummer for the Doobie Brothers. Keith Knudsen died of cancer in 2005. Knudsen's successor Michael Hossack ultimately did not continue on with the band and died in 2012. Hossack, in turn, was succeeded by Tony Pia, who ultimately left the band. Following Pia's departure, Toth became the sole drummer for the Doobie Brothers in 2005 and remains in this capacity presently.

Toth says he has been influenced by Stewart Copeland, Neil Peart, Bill Bruford, and a host of other virtuoso drummers. He has also produced some critically acclaimed albums and started a band called Cooper along with Tim Bradshaw, a friend of Toth's.

References

External links
Amarillo Globe News: Vertical Horizon, Bookseller's life changed by joining band

American rock drummers
People from East Lyme, Connecticut
University of Miami Frost School of Music alumni
Vertical Horizon
The Doobie Brothers members
Living people
Musicians from Connecticut
Year of birth missing (living people)